Nawuni is a community in Kumbungu District in the Northern Region of Ghana. The settlement is a fishing community who are mostly from the volta region of Ghana. Ghana water company limited draw raw water from the nawuni dam for treatment in dalun.

See also

References 

Communities in Ghana
Populated places in Kumbungu District